Allium litardierei is a North African species of wild onion native to Algeria and Morocco.

The oldest name applied to the taxon is the 1924 moniker Allium paniculatum subsp. breviscapum Litard. & Maire. Elevating the epithet breviscapum to species level is prevented by the existence of the 1885 name Allium breviscapum Stapf, hence the need for a new name, Allium litardierei J.-M.Tison in 2010.

References

litardierei
Onions
Flora of North Africa
Plants described in 1924